Felix Bandaranaike may refer to:

Felix Reginald Dias Bandaranaike I (1861–1947), Ceylonese judge
Felix Reginald Dias Bandaranaike II (1891–1951), Ceylonese judge
Felix Dias Bandaranaike (1930–1985), Sri Lankan politician